Dasypyrum is a genus of Eurasian and North African plants in the grass family, native to the basins of the Mediterranean, Black, and Caspian Seas.

Species
Species include:
 Dasypyrum hordeaceum (Hack.) P.Candargy - Greece, Morocco, Algeria
 Dasypyrum villosum (L.) Borbás, Term. - Balearic Islands, Corsica, Sardinia, France, Italy, Greece, Balkans, Ukraine, Crimea, Turkmenistan, Caucasus, Turkey

Formerly included

Species formerly included:
Dasypyrum sinaicum — Eremopyrum bonaepartis

References

External links
GBIF.org: Dasypyrum entry

Pooideae
Grasses of Africa
Grasses of Asia
Grasses of Europe
Flora of North Africa
Flora of Western Asia
Poaceae genera